Troglocaris anophthalmus is a species of freshwater shrimp in the family Atyidae. It lives in karstic caves in Bosnia and Herzegovina, Croatia, Italy and Slovenia.

Like other underground-living animals, this shrimp lacks pigment (appearing whitish) and eyes.

It was originally described by Vincenz Kollar as Palaemon anophtalmus (a misspelling of "anophthalmus"), but this name was considered to be a nomen nudum for a long time. This name is, however, accompanied by a description, and predates Dormitzer's junior synonym Troglocaris schmidtii.

References

External links

Further reading

Atyidae
Cave shrimp
Freshwater crustaceans of Europe
Crustaceans described in 1848
Taxa named by Vincenz Kollar
Taxonomy articles created by Polbot